The Men's discus throw at the 2014 Commonwealth Games as part of the athletics programme took place at Hampden Park on 30 and 31 July 2014.

Results

Qualifying round

Final

References

Men's discus throw
2014